Wuxu is a town in Jiangnan District, Nanning, Guangxi. , it administers the following three residential communities and ten villages:
Wuxu Community
Mingyang Community
Minghong Community
Pingdong Village
Pingdan Village
Nade Village
Dingning Village
Kangning Village
Xiangning Village
Yonghong Village
Tanbai Village
Nabei Village
Xinqiao Village

References

Nanning
Towns of Guangxi